Sept Days is a weekly Chinese language Chinese newspaper in Montreal, Quebec, Canada. It publishes a Chinese Language Newspaper Sept Days, a Business Weekly and a monthly Newspaper La Connexion in French. It also has a readers club organizing all kinds activities. It published 7 books including  Elite Chinese Canadians(2018 ), Inspired by Norman Bethune (2014) etc.

External links

 (broken link)

Asian-Canadian culture in Montreal
Chinese-language newspapers published in Canada
Newspapers published in Montreal
Chinese-language newspapers (Traditional Chinese)
Publications established in 2006
2006 establishments in Quebec